Nine Mile Island may refer to:

 Nine-Mile Island (Mississippi River), an Upper Mississippi River island near Dubuque, Iowa
 Ninemile Island (Pennsylvania), an Allegheny River island near Blawnox, Pennsylvania
 Nine Mile Island State Natural Area, a Chippewa River island near Durand, Wisconsin